Maluan railway station is a railway station located in Maluan Subdistrict, Phunphin District, Surat Thani, Thailand.

Train services 
 Local No. 445/446 Chumphon-Hat Yai Junction-Chumphon

References 
 
 

Railway stations in Thailand